The Iowa State Cyclones men's basketball and women's basketball programs compete at the Division I level of the National Collegiate Athletic Association (NCAA), representing Iowa State University in the Big 12 Conference.

The men's program has been led by 20 head coaches since its organization in 1908. In its 102 years, the team has played over 2300 games and made thirteen appearances in the NCAA Tournament, including a Final Four appearance in 1944. Johnny Orr is the all-time leader in games coached and wins. Tim Floyd is the all-time leader in winning percentage. Statistically, Ken Trickey has been the least successful coach of the Cyclone men, with a winning percentage of .245. The current men's coach is T. J. Otzelberger, who was hired in June 2021.

The women's team has been led by six head coaches since it was organized in 1974. During its 38 seasons, the Cyclone women have played over 1000 games and made ten appearances at the NCAA Tournament, including two Elite Eight appearances. Current head coach, Bill Fennelly, is the all-time leader in games coached, wins, and winning percentage. Theresa Becker, statistically, is the least successful women's coach with a winning percentage of .222.

Key

Coaches
Statistics are correct as of the end of the 2009–10 men's and women's college basketball season.

Men's

Women's

Notes

References
General

Specific

Iowa State
Iowa State

Iowa State Cyclones basketbeall, men's, coaches